Eugnosta trimeni is a species of moth of the  family Tortricidae. It is found in Lesotho, Mozambique and South Africa.

References

Moths described in 1875
Eugnosta